Ashtead railway station is in Ashtead, Surrey, England.

History

Designed by David Field in 1858 and opened by the Epsom and Leatherhead Railway, part of the London and South Western Railway,  it became a joint station between that railway and the London, Brighton and South Coast Railway and was absorbed into the Southern Railway by the grouping of 1923. The station passed to the Southern Region of British Railways on nationalisation in 1948.

When sectorisation was introduced in the 1980s, the station was served by Network SouthEast until the privatisation of British Rail.

Before its renovation, the station was designed by Nigel Wikeley in the typical 'CLASP' manner, with a long and low design constructed from prefabricated materials. The main ticket office building was rebuilt in 2013.

Services
Services at Ashtead are operated by Southern and South Western Railway using  and   EMUs.

The typical off-peak service in trains per hour is:
 2 tph to  via 
 2 tph to  via 
 1 tph to 

On Saturday evenings (after approximately 18:45) and on Sundays, there is no service south of Dorking to Horsham.

References

Bibliography

External links

Railway stations in Surrey
Former London and South Western Railway stations
Former London, Brighton and South Coast Railway stations

Railway stations in Great Britain opened in 1859
Railway stations served by Govia Thameslink Railway
Railway stations served by South Western Railway
1859 establishments in England